Gustave Saacké (20 August 1884 – 18 April 1975) was a French architect. In 1932 he won a gold medal in the art competitions of the Olympic Games together with Pierre Montenot and Pierre Bailly for their design of a "Cirque pour Toros" ("Circus for Bullfights").

References

External links
 

1884 births
1975 deaths
20th-century French architects
Olympic gold medalists in art competitions
Medalists at the 1932 Summer Olympics
Olympic competitors in art competitions